Dhauvaa is a 1998 Maldivian film directed by Arifa Ibrahim. Produced by Aslam Rasheed under Slam Studio, the film stars Reeko Moosa Manik, Niuma Mohamed and Waleedha Waleed in pivotal roles. The film was an unofficial remake of Deepak Sareen's Bollywood film Aaina (1993), starring Juhi Chawla, Jackie Shroff and Amrita Singh in lead roles.

Premise
Soma Hassan (Waleedha Waleed) and Seema Hassan (Niuma Mohamed) are two siblings who have grown up to be entirely different to each other. The former is an arrogant, spoiled child who gets everything she desires at any cost while the latter is a soft-spoken, sensitive shy girl who lets her sister take the limelight. Complications arise between the siblings when the two sisters fall in love with the same man, Mohamed Areesh (Reeko Moosa Manik).

Cast 
 Reeko Moosa Manik as Mohamed Areesh
 Niuma Mohamed as Seema Hassan
 Sheleen as Young Seema Hassan
 Waleedha Waleed as Soma Hassan
 Shifaza as Young Soma Hassan
 Arifa Ibrahim as Soma and Seema's mother
 Ali Shameel as Hassan Manik
 Ibrahim Wisan as Ayaz; Areesh's brother
 Roanu Hassan Manik
 Aminath Ibrahim Didi as an auction member (Special appearance)
 Hamid Ali as Seema's Doctor (Special appearance)

Soundtrack

References

Maldivian drama films
1998 films
Remakes of Maldivian films
Films directed by Arifa Ibrahim
1998 drama films
Dhivehi-language films